The Catholic Diocese of Westminster is an archdiocese of the Latin Church of the Catholic Church in England. The diocese consists of most of London north of the River Thames and west of the River Lea, the borough of Spelthorne (in Surrey), and the county of Hertfordshire, which lies immediately to London's north.

The diocese is led by the Archbishop of Westminster, who serves as pastor of the mother church, Westminster Cathedral, as well as the metropolitan bishop of the ecclesiastical Province of Westminster.  Since the re-establishment of the English Catholic dioceses in 1850, each Archbishop of Westminster—including the incumbent, Cardinal Vincent Gerard Nichols—has been created a cardinal by the Pope in consistory, often as the only cardinal in England, and is now the 43rd of English cardinals since the 12th century. It is also customary for the Archbishop of Westminster to be elected President of the Catholic Bishops' Conference of England and Wales providing a degree of a formal direction for the other English bishops and archbishops. Though not formally a primate, he has special privileges conferred by the Papal Bull Si qua est. The Archbishop of Westminster has not been granted the title of Primate of England and Wales, which is sometimes applied to him, but his position has been described as that of "chief metropolitan" of the Catholic Church in England and Wales and as "similar to" that of the Archbishop of Canterbury in the Church of England (as the metropolitan bishop of the Province of Canterbury). The diocese is one of the smallest dioceses in England and Wales in geographical area, but the largest in terms of Catholic population and priests.

The suffragan sees of Westminster are the dioceses of Brentwood, East Anglia, Northampton, and Nottingham.

History
The diocese essentially covers the same region as the Church of England Diocese of London as it was before the English Reformation until 1850, adopting—like all other dioceses across England (created that year)—an alternative name (originally because of the Ecclesiastical Titles Act 1851) but based on the centuries-old divisions of the country. The diocese effectively survived the period of Catholic oppression in English history as a missionary territory established by canons accepted by Rome in 1622 as the Apostolic Vicariate of England which was in public law pronounced in England and Wales illegal as counter to the established church.

The mostly clandestine apostolic vicariate covering the country was divided so that the Apostolic Vicariate of London District formed on 30 January 1688 coinciding with a degree of freedoms. By decree of Pope Pius IX (Universalis Ecclesiae), this entity gained its elevation to the rank of a metropolitan diocese (instead of archdiocese) on 29 September 1850.

Present
On 3 April 2009, it was announced that the Archbishop of Birmingham, the Most Reverend Vincent Nichols, would become the 11th Archbishop of Westminster. Cormac Murphy-O'Connor, who was installed as tenth Archbishop of Westminster on 22 March 2000 and was elevated to the rank of cardinal-priest of the title of Santa Maria Sopra Minerva by Pope John Paul II on 21 February 2001, became archbishop emeritus. Cardinal Murphy-O'Connor had announced on 9 July 2007 that, in accordance with the age limit of 75 years prescribed for bishops in the 1983 Code of Canon Law, he had submitted his resignation to Pope Benedict XVI, but that the Pope had asked him to continue in his pastoral ministry as archbishop beyond the age limit until further provision was made, as occurred in 2009.

The archbishop is usually assisted by four auxiliary bishops, each with specific areas of responsibility within the administration of the diocese. One of the auxiliary bishops serves as chancellor and moderator of the metropolitan curia; one as vicar for the clergy; one for pastoral affairs; and one for education and formation.

The metropolitan curia and chancery offices are located at Vaughan House, outside Westminster Cathedral in central London. The diocesan seminary, Allen Hall, is located in Chelsea, West London, and (with Ushaw College) is a direct descendant of the seminary of Douai College, France.

The Diocese is a registered charity No.233699.

Bishops

Ordinaries

Vicars Apostolic of England (and Wales)
William Bishop (1623–1624)
Richard Smith (1624–1632)
John Leyburn (1685–1688); see below

Vicars Apostolic of London District
John Leyburn (1688–1702); see above
Bonaventure Giffard (1703–1734)
Benjamin Petre (1734–1758)
Richard Challoner (1758–1781)
James Robert Talbot (1781–1790)
John Douglass (1790–1812)
William Poynter (1812–1827)
James Yorke Bramston (1827–1836)
Thomas Griffiths (1836–1847)
Thomas Walsh (1848–1849)
Nicholas Wiseman (1849–1850): see below; future Cardinal

Archbishops

 Cardinal Nicholas Wiseman (1850–1865): see above
 Cardinal Henry Manning (1865–1892)
 Cardinal Herbert Vaughan (1892–1903)
 Cardinal Francis Bourne (1903–1935)
 Cardinal Arthur Hinsley (1935–1943)
 Cardinal Bernard Griffin (1943–1956)
 Cardinal William Godfrey (1956–1963)
 Cardinal John Carmel Heenan (1963–1976)
 Cardinal Basil Hume, OSB (1976–1999)
 Cardinal Cormac Murphy-O'Connor (2000–2009)
 Cardinal Vincent Nichols (2009–present)

Coadjutor Vicars Apostolic 
James Yorke Bramston (1823–1827)
Richard Challoner (1739–1758)
Robert Gradwell (1828–1833), did not succeed to see
Thomas Griffiths (1833–1836)
Henry Howard (1720), did not take effect
Benjamin Petre (1721–1734)
William Poynter (1803–1812)
James Robert Talbot (1759–1781)

Coadjutor Archbishops
George Errington (1855–1860), did not succeed to see
Edward Myers (1951–1956), did not succeed to see

Auxiliary Bishops
William Weathers (1872–1895)
James Laird Patterson (1880–1902)
Robert Brindle (1899–1901), appointed Bishop of Nottingham
Algernon Charles Stanley (1903–1928)
Patrick Fenton (1904–1918)
William Anthony Johnson (1906–1909)
Joseph Butt (1911–1938)
Emmanuel John Bidwell (1917–1930)
Edward Myers (1932-–1951), appointed Coadjutor here
David James Mathew (1938–1946), appointed apostolic delegate and titular archbishop
George Laurence Craven (1947–1967)
David John Cashman (1958–1965), appointed Bishop of Arundel and Brighton
Patrick Joseph Casey (1965–1969), appointed Bishop of Brentwood
Basil Butler (1966–1986)
Gerald Thomas Mahon (1970–1992)
Victor Guazzelli (1970–1996)
David Konstant (1977–1985), appointed Bishop of Leeds
Philip James Benedict Harvey (1977–1990)
James Joseph O'Brien (1977–2005)
John Patrick Crowley (1986–1992), appointed Bishop of Middlesbrough
Vincent Gerard Nichols (1991–2000), appointed Archbishop of Birmingham; later returned here as Archbishop; future Cardinal
Patrick O'Donoghue (1993–2001), appointed Bishop of Lancaster
Arthur Roche (2001–2002), appointed Coadjutor Bishop of Leeds
George Stack (2001–2011), appointed Archbishop of Cardiff, Wales
Bernard Longley (2003–2009), appointed Archbishop of Birmingham
Alan Stephen Hopes (2003–2013), appointed Bishop of East Anglia
John Stanley Kenneth Arnold (2005–2014), appointed Bishop of Salford
John Francis Sherrington (2011–present)
Nicholas Gilbert Erskine Hudson (2014–present)
John Wilson (2015–2019), appointed Archbishop of Southwark
Paul McAleenan (2015–present)

Other priests of this diocese who became bishops
Bonaventure Giffard, appointed Vicar Apostolic of Western District in 1688; later returned here as Vicar Apostolic
James Smith, appointed Vicar Apostolic of Northern District in 1688
John Talbot Stonor, appointed Vicar Apostolic of Northern District in 1715
Francis Petre, appointed Coadjutor Vicar Apostolic of Northern District in 1750
Thomas Joseph Talbot, appointed Coadjutor Vicar Apostolic of Midland District in 1766
William Walton, appointed Coadjutor Vicar Apostolic of Northern District in 1770
Charles Berington, appointed Coadjutor Vicar Apostolic of Midland District in 1786
John Vertue (Virtue), appointed Bishop of Portsmouth in 1882
John Larkin, appointed Coadjutor Bishop of Kingston, Ontario, Canada in 1832 and Bishop of Toronto, Ontario, Canada in 1849; neither took effect; became a Jesuit in 1840
Charles Michael Baggs, appointed Vicar Apostolic of Western District in 1844
Thomas Grant, appointed Bishop of Southwark in 1851
John Baptist Butt, appointed auxiliary bishop of Southwark in 1884
Henry O'Callaghan, appointed Bishop of Hexham and New Castle in 1887
Peter Emmanuel Amigo, appointed Bishop of Southwark in 1904
Thomas Dunn, appointed Bishop of Nottingham in 1916
Bernard Nicholas Ward, appointed Apostolic Administrator, later Bishop, of Brentwood in 1917
James Donald Scanlan, appointed Coadjutor Bishop of Dunkeld, Scotland in 1946
Derek John Harford Worlock, appointed Bishop of Portsmouth in 1965
William Gordon Wheeler, appointed Coadjutor Bishop of Middlesbrough in 1964, later Bishop, of Leeds in 1966
Mark O'Toole, appointed Bishop of Plymouth in 2013

Liturgical and pastoral life

Liturgy in the diocese is primarily based around the ordinary form of the Roman Rite, promulgated by Pope Paul VI, now in its third edition. However, as might be expected from a city as cosmopolitan as London, there is a great diversity in the liturgy as celebrated by Catholics. The Latin Mass Society celebrates the liturgy according to the extraordinary form of the Roman Rite. The Ukrainian Greek Catholics have a strong presence in the diocese with their own cathedral in Binney Street close to Bond Street.  There is a Lebanese Maronite community based at Our Lady of Sorrows Catholic Church in Cirencester Street in West London; a Melkite community in Pimlico, at St Barnabas' Church of England church; an Ethiopian Catholic church, Our Lady Queen of Heaven, in Queensway West London; an Eritrean Catholic Church, St Aidan of Lindisfarne, in East Acton; a Chaldean Catholic church, St Anne's, in Laxton Place; and a Belarusian Catholic church in Holden Avenue in North London. There are also a large number of Masses for the expatriate Polish community; as well as dedicated French, German, Italian, Portuguese and Spanish language churches. There are also ethnic chaplaincies serving Catholics from Africa, Albania, Brazil, the Caribbean, China, Croatia, the Philippines, India, Hungary, Ireland, Korea, Latin America, Lithuania, Malta, Portugal, Romania, Slovakia, Czechia, Slovenia, Sri Lanka, Traveller, Gypsy and Roma communities, and Vietnam.

The diocese is also responsible for many institutional chaplaincies, including Heathrow Airport, hospitals and prisons. See St. George's Interdenominational Chapel, Heathrow Airport for more information about the Heathrow Airport Latin-Church Catholic chaplaincy.

There are a large number of religious communities in the diocese. Religious orders of men include: the Assumptionists at Bethnal Green, Hitchin and Burnt Oak; the Augustinians at Hammersmith and Hoxton; the Augustinian Recollects at Kensal New Town, Kensington and Wembley; the Benedictines at Ealing Abbey and Cockfosters; the Carmelites at Finchley East; Discalced Carmelites at Kensington; the Christian Brothers at Twickenham; the missionary Columban Fathers at Hampstead; the Dominicans at Haverstock Hill; the Franciscans at Pimlico; the Franciscan Friars of the Atonement in Westminster; the Holy Ghost Fathers at New Barnett and Northwood; and the Passionists at Highgate. The Jesuits have a large presence in London with communities in Mayfair (at Farm Street), Southall, Stamford Hill, Swiss Cottage, and Wimbledon. The Oratorians are based at the Church of the Immaculate Heart of Mary in Kensington, which is popularly known as the Brompton Oratory and is the largest church in the diocese after Westminster Cathedral.

Religious communities of women include the Carmelites at Golders Green and Ware; the Poor Clares in Barnet; the Franciscan Sisters of Our Lady of Victories at the cathedral; the Ursulines of Jesus at Hoxton, Kingsland and Stamford Hill; the Dominicans at Bushey, Cricklewood, Ealing, Edgware, Harpenden, Harrow on the Hill, Haverstock Hill, Hemel Hempstead, Osterley, Stevenage and Pinner.  The Institute of the BVM is located in Swiss Cottage, Acton, Osterley, Redbourn and St Albans.  The Sisters of Mercy are located at the cathedral, Acton East, Bethnal Green, Bow, Clapton Park, Commercial Road, Cricklewood, Feltham, Hampton Hill, Hillingdon, Kensal, Newtown, Marylebone Road, St Albans, St John's Wood, Twickenham and Underwood Road.  The Servants of the Mother of God at Bayswater, Hampton and Somers Town.

The diocese is involved in both the independent and state school sectors. Some 159 state and 10 independent primary schools are in the diocese along with 42 state and 4 independent secondary schools.  There are also a further five independent primary / secondary and special schools including the Choristers school attached to the cathedral.

Music in the diocese is as diverse as the communities represented in it, but the all-male cathedral choir is reputedly one of the best in the country and sings at all chief Masses in the cathedral as well as the daily divine offices. There are several choirs that specialise in Gregorian Chant and a Charismatic group centred on the diocesan seminary at Allen Hall.

See also
List of churches in the City of Westminster
St George's Interdenominational Chapel, Heathrow Airport
 Catholic Church in England and Wales
 List of Catholic churches in the United Kingdom

Notes and references
Notes 

References

External links
Roman Catholic Diocese of Westminster official website
 GCatholic.org

 Parishes of the Diocese

Video clips
Diocese of Westminster YouTube channel
Diocese of Westminster on Vimeo

 
Religion in the City of Westminster
Religion in Hertfordshire
Pope Pius IX
Westminster
Westminster
1850 establishments in England
Westminster
Charities based in London